Nawaf Al-Sobhi (born 12 March 1990) is a professional Saudi Arabian footballer who plays as a center back for Al-Adalah.

References

External links
 

Living people
1990 births
Sportspeople from Mecca
Association football defenders
Saudi Arabian footballers
Najran SC players
Al-Qadsiah FC players
Al-Fayha FC players
Al-Taawoun FC players
Al-Adalah FC players
Place of birth missing (living people)
Saudi Professional League players
Saudi First Division League players